= Orange County Cousins Club =

The Orange County Cousins Club is an Orange County, California based organization formed by Israelis, Palestinians, Americans, and others to promote dialogue and action concerning the ongoing conflict between the Palestinian and Israeli people. Unlike its various sister organizations, such as the Los Angeles Cousins Club, the Orange County Cousins Club places a great deal of focus on action, donating funds to groups which choose to focus on peace. The Cousins Club was formed in 1988 by peace activists including Dr. Robby Gordon.

== Seven Points ==
The club advocates a 7-point agreement as a framework for achieving a sustainable peace in the region, these are:

1. We continue to favor a two-state solution: a viable Palestinian state with peace and security for both Israel and Palestine.
2. The two-state solution can only be implemented by ending the occupation of the West Bank and Gaza, including East Jerusalem.
3. There can be no peace without justice for the Palestinians. This includes the right of return or a just compensation.
4. Israeli settlers on the West Bank may choose to live under Palestinian rule or return to Israel with fair compensation.
5. Encourage Israel to end its internal discrimination policies against the Arab Israeli minority.
6. The United States should be evenhanded when mediating between Israel and Palestine. This includes comparable economic aid and the protection of human rights.
7. Holy sites should be accessible to all.
